Lys Assia (born Rosa Mina Schärer; 3 March 1924 – 24 March 2018) was a Swiss singer who won the first Eurovision Song Contest in 1956. Assia was born in Rupperswil, Aargau, and began her stage career as a dancer, but changed to singing in 1940 after successfully standing in for a female singer.

Eurovision Song Contest
In 1956 she was the winner of the first Eurovision Song Contest, in which she sang for Switzerland. She had also been in the German national final of that year and returned to the contest again for Switzerland in 1957 and 1958.
Her Eurovision success was followed by success in Germany with "O mein Papa".

In 2005, Assia performed at the Congratulations: 50 Years of the Eurovision Song Contest event.

In 2009, together with Dima Bilan (2008 winner), Assia presented the Eurovision trophy to that year's winner Alexander Rybak.

In September 2011, Assia entered her song "C'était ma vie", written by Ralph Siegel and Jean Paul Cara, into the Swiss national selection for the Eurovision Song Contest 2012 in Baku, Azerbaijan. The song came eighth in a closely fought national selection. She attended the event in Baku as a guest of honour.

In 2012, Assia again entered the Swiss national selection Die grosse Entscheidungs Show to represent Switzerland in Malmö at the Eurovision Song Contest 2013 with the song "All in Your Head" featuring the hip-hop band New Jack. There were rumours of Assia representing San Marino, but it was announced on 30 January 2013 that Valentina Monetta would do so. She later made a guest appearance during the contest's second semi-final.
In 2015, at age 91, Assia was in the audience in London for the special Eurovision Song Contest's Greatest Hits concert celebrating the Contest's 60th anniversary. This was her last public appearance.

Personal life
Assia married Johann Heinrich Kunz on 11 January 1957 in Zürich. Kunz died just nine months later after battling a serious illness. In 1963, she married Danish businessman Oscar Pedersen, who died in 1995. She died on 24 March 2018 in Zürich.

References

External links

1924 births
2018 deaths
People from Lenzburg District
Eurovision Song Contest winners
Eurovision Song Contest entrants for Switzerland
Eurovision Song Contest entrants of 1956
Eurovision Song Contest entrants of 1957
Eurovision Song Contest entrants of 1958
Schlager musicians
French-language singers of Switzerland
German-language singers of Switzerland
Italian-language singers of Switzerland
20th-century Swiss women singers